Caravello is a surname. Notable people with the surname include:

Eric Carr (born Paul Charles Caravello; 1950–1991), American musician
Joe Caravello (born 1963), American football player
Perry Caravello (born 1963), American actor, comedian, podcaster, and 2020 President candidate

See also
Caravelle (disambiguation)